"Losin'" is Yuna Ito's 5th single. This is her second single in her series of hot and cool singles, limited to 70 000 copies. Losin is the Japanese ending theme to Lost Season 2 that airs on AXN.

Overview
Both this single and her previous single, "Stuck on You", were limited to 70,000 copies each. "Stuck on You" was described as "hot" single for the summer while "Losin'" was a "cool" single for the fall. For those who bought both singles, they would receive a special invitation to Yuna Ito's first tour, an invitation-only tour called "Yuna Ito's 1st Invitation".
This song features both English and Japanese lyrics.

Track listing
 Losin'
 Stay for Love
 Losin’: Simplicity Mix

Live performances
September 8, 2006 — Music Fighter 
September 16, 2006 — CDTV

Charts
Oricon Sales Chart (Japan)

2006 singles
Yuna Ito songs